Mester is a surname. Notable people with the name include:
 Đula Mešter (born 1972), Serbian volleyball player of Hungarian ethnicity 
 Endre Mester (1903–1984), Hungarian pioneer of laser medicine
 Jorge Mester (born 1935), Mexican conductor of Hungarian ancestry
 Loretta Mester, American President and CEO of the Federal Reserve Bank of Cleveland
 Mathias Mester (born 1986), German Paralympian athlete
 Milan Mešter (born 1975), Montenegrin football manager and former player

See also
 Meester
 Little mester, a self-employed worker who rents space in a factory or works from their own workshop
 Semester, an academic term (or simply term) or portion of an academic year, during which an educational institution holds classes
 Trimester (disambiguation), a period of three months